Tetera Faulkner (born 26 July 1988) is an Australian professional rugby union player. He currently represents the New South Wales Waratahs in the Super Rugby competition. His regular playing position is prop.

Early life 

Faulkner was born in Tauranga, New Zealand and lived his early years at Te Puna in the Bay of Plenty. At 12 years of age, he moved with his family to Melbourne, Australia. He played his junior rugby at Moorabbin Rams and played age-group representative rugby for Victoria. Faulkner attended Cheltenham Secondary College in Melbourne before transferring to Marist College Canberra. He played for the Australian Schoolboys team in 2006.

Faulkner represented Australia at the IRB Under 19 Rugby World Championship in Ireland in 2007. He represented Australia at Under 20 level at the inaugural IRB Junior World Championship in Wales in 2008.

Rugby career 

Faulkner played club rugby for Tuggeranong Vikings in Canberra from 2007, and joined the Brumby Runners development squad in 2008. In 2010, he transferred to the Southern Districts Rugby Club in Sydney and also played for the Junior Waratahs development side in the Pacific Rugby Cup.

In 2011 Faulkner was recruited to the Western Force to play in the 2012 season. He made an earlier than expected debut when called upon as an injury replacement late in the 2011 Super Rugby season. Faulkner earned his first Super Rugby cap on 17 June 2011, against the Rebels in Melbourne.

Faulkner currently plays his club rugby for Wanneroo Districts Rugby Football Club in Perth, Western Australia.

Super Rugby statistics

References

External links 
Western Force profile

1988 births
Australian rugby union players
Australia international rugby union players
Western Force players
Rugby union props
New Zealand emigrants to Australia
Rugby union players from Tauranga
Living people
Perth Spirit players
Melbourne Rebels players
Melbourne Rising players
New South Wales Waratahs players